Dundalk entered the 2021 season as the FAI Cup holders, and were still the League of Ireland Cup holders, having won it in 2019, because of the competition not running in 2020. Having qualified for European football for the eighth season in a row, they were entered in the new UEFA Europa Conference League. 2021 was Dundalk's 13th consecutive season in the top tier of Irish football, their 86th in all, and their 95th in the League of Ireland.

Jim Magilton was the club's new Sporting Director going into the new term, having taken up the role at the end of the 2020 season. Shane Keegan was named the First Team Manager at the beginning of the season, replacing Interim Head Coach from 2020, Filippo Giovagnoli, who was retained as First Team Coach. Giovagnoli could not be named manager because he did not hold a UEFA Pro Licence.

Season summary
For the second season in a row, both the League of Ireland Cup and the Leinster Senior Cup were deferred because of delays and restrictions caused by the ongoing COVID-19 pandemic.

Having not been held in 2020, the President's Cup (the traditional season curtain-raiser) was played on 12 March between League Champions Shamrock Rovers and FAI Cup holders Dundalk. Dundalk won the match on penalties, 4–3, after it had finished 1–1 in 90 minutes.

The league season started a week later on 19 March 2021 and after a run of defeats at the start of the league campaign, which saw Dundalk lie second from bottom after five matches, both Keegan and Giovagnoli resigned. Sporting Director Jim Magilton assumed a caretaker manager role, pending the appointment of a new manager. On 16 June, Vinny Perth, who had been sacked midway through the previous season, returned to the club as manager. They continued to struggle in the league and were briefly threatened with a promotion/relegation play-off, before recovering somewhat to end the season in sixth place.

In the FAI Cup, a run of six appearances in a row in the final (a joint record for the competition) was ended when they were knocked out at the semi final stage by St Patrick's Athletic, managed by former captain Stephen O'Donnell.

In Europe, they defeated Newtown A.F.C. of Wales in the first qualifying round of the new Europa Conference League 5–0 on aggregate, which included a club European record equaling 4–0 victory in the first leg. In the second qualifying round, they overcame Levadia Tallinn 4–3 on aggregate with Will Patching scoring a stoppage time winner in the second leg in Estonia. They were knocked out in the third qualifying round by Vitesse Arnhem, 4–3 on aggregate, after a 2–1 defeat in the second leg at 'home' in Tallaght Stadium, which saw a Michael Duffy goal after 40 seconds incorrectly disallowed for offside.

Before the season ended, the club was returned to local ownership when a consortium led by former co-owner Andy Connolly and sports technology firm STATSports agreed a takeover with Peak6. Sporting Director Jim Magilton left the club in the aftermath of the takeover.

First-Team Squad (2021)
Sources:
Note: Substitute appearances in brackets

Out on loan

Competitions

President's Cup

Premier Division

League table

FAI Cup

Europa Conference League
First qualifying round

Dundalk won 5–0 on aggregate.
Second qualifying round

Dundalk won 4–3 on aggregate.
Third qualifying round

Dundalk lost 4–3 on aggregate.

Footnotes

References

Dundalk F.C. seasons
Dundalk